Special Escort Group may refer to:

 Special Escort Group (Metropolitan Police), London
 Special Escort Group (Ministry of Defence Police), for nuclear materials transit, United Kingdom

See also
 Escorts Group, engineering firm
 Escort Group, World War II allied North Atlantic convoy escort package
 Mid-Ocean Escort Force, World War II allied North Atlantic escort resources